The Iron Crown is a relic and may be one of the oldest royal insignia of Christendom. It was made in the Early Middle Ages, consisting of a circlet of gold and jewels fitted around a central silver band, which tradition held to be made of iron beaten out of a nail of the True Cross. In the medieval Kingdom of Italy, the crown came to be seen as a relic from the Kingdom of the Lombards and was used as regalia for the coronation of the Holy Roman Emperors as kings of Italy. It is kept in the Duomo of Monza.

Description
The Iron Crown is so called because it contains a one-centimetre-wide band within it, that is said to have been beaten out of a nail used at the crucifixion of Jesus. The outer circlet of the crown is made of six segments of beaten gold, partly enameled, joined together by hinges. It is set with 22 gemstones that stand out in relief, in the form of crosses and flowers. Its small size and hinged construction have suggested to some that it was originally a large armlet or, most probably, a votive crown. According to other opinions, the small size is due to a readjustment after the loss of two segments, as described in historical documents.

Legend

According to tradition, St. Helena, mother of Constantine the Great, had the crown forged for her son around a beaten nail from the True Cross, which she had discovered. Pope Gregory the Great passed this crown to Theodelinda, princess of the Lombards, as a diplomatic gift, although he made no mention of it among his recorded donations. Theodelinda donated the crown to the church at Monza in 628.

According to another tradition reported by the historian Valeriana Maspero, the helm and the bit of Constantine were brought to Milan by the emperor Theodosius I, who resided there, and were exposed at his funeral, as described by Ambrose in his funeral oration De obitu Theosdosii. Then, as the bit remained in Milan (where it is currently preserved in the cathedral), the helm with the diadem was transferred to Constantinople, until Theoderic the Great, who had previously threatened Constantinople itself, claimed it as part of his right as the king of Italy. The Byzantines then sent him the diadem, holding the helmet (which was exposed in the cathedral of Hagia Sophia) until it was looted and lost following the sack of Constantinople in the Fourth Crusade in 1204. King Theoderic then adopted the diadem gemmis insignitum, quas pretiosior ferro innexa(s)crucis redemptoris divinae gemma connecteretas (Ambrose De obitu Theosdosii) as his crown. This is the Iron Crown, passed by the Goths to the Lombards when they invaded Italy.

The crown was used in Charlemagne's coronation as King of the Lombards in 774.

History
The crown was certainly in use for the coronation of the kings of Italy by the 14th century, and supposedly since at least the 11th. 

Old research dates the crown to the 8th or early 9th century. However, according to a more recent study, the crown in its current state is the result of two different works made between the 4–5th and the 9th century. This seems to validate the legends about the origin of the crown, that date it back to the Lombard era. In reality, the Lombard royalty ignored the coronation ceremonies in any case, but, as for other Germanic populations, the symbol of royalty was the lance that the sovereign received when he was acclaimed sovereign by the armed people in the royal palace of Pavia.

Lord Twining cites a hypothesis by Reinhold N. Elze that Gisela, the daughter of the Emperor Louis the Pious who married Duke Eberhard of Friuli, may have originally possessed the crown and left it to her son Berengar I of Italy on her death in 874. Berengar was the only major benefactor of the church at Monza at this time, and also gave the Cathedral of St. John in Monza a cross made in the same style as the Iron Crown, which is still preserved in the church's treasury. The crown and cross may therefore have been made as a votive ornament. Twining also notes that the Imperial Museum at St. Petersburg includes in its collection two medieval crowns found at Kazan in 1730 made in the same style and of the same size as the Iron Crown. Twining notes that while these crowns and the Iron Crown are too small to be worn around an adult human head, they could be worn on the top of the head if they were affixed to a veil, and this would account for the small holes on the rim of the Iron Crown. Twining also mentions a relief plaque in the cathedral which appears to represent the coronation of Otto IV, Holy Roman Emperor at Milan in 1209 as it was described by Morigias in 1345 and stresses the point that although four votive crowns are shown hanging above the altar, the crown which the archbishop is placing on the king's head bears no resemblance to the Iron Crown.

Finally, Twining cites a study by Ludovico Antonio Muratori which documents the various degrees of the ecclesiastical authorities alternately authorizing and suppressing the veneration of the Iron Crown until, in 1688, the matter was subjected to be studied by the Congregation of Rites in Rome, which in 1715 diplomatically concluded its official examination by permitting the Iron Crown to be exposed for public veneration and carried in processions, but leaving the essential point of whether the iron ring came from one of the nails of Christ's crucifixion undecided. However, subsequently Archbishop Visconti of Milan gave his own decision that "the iron ring in the Monza crown should be considered as one of the Nails of the Holy Cross and as an original relic." Twining notes that the clergy of Monza assert that despite the centuries that the Iron Crown has been exposed to public veneration, there is not a speck of rust on the essential inner iron ring. Lipinsky, in his examination of the Iron Crown in 1985, noted that the inner ring does not attract a magnet. Analysis of the inner ring in 1993 revealed that the ring is made of silver.

Thirty-four supposed coronations with the Iron Crown were counted by the historian Bartolomeo Zucchi from the 9th to the 17th century (beginning with Charlemagne). The Encyclopædia Britannica states that the first reliable record of the use of the Iron Crown in the coronation of a King of Italy is that of the coronation of Henry VII in 1312. Later coronations in which the crown was used include:
 Charles IV (1355, at the presence of Petrarch)
 Sigismund (1431)
 Charles V (1530)
 Napoleon I (1805)
 Ferdinand I of Austria (1838)

Since the 10th century, the Roman-Germanic Kings would travel to Rome to be crowned Holy Roman Emperors. Enroute they traditionally stopped in Lombardy to be crowned as Kings of Italy, supposedly with the Iron Crown.
The traditional site of the coronation was Pavia, the old Lombard capital, in the Basilica San Michele Maggiore. Starting with Conrad II in 1026, coronations were also performed at Milan. In 1530, Charles V received the Iron Crown simultaneously with his Imperial coronation at Bologna.

On 26 May 1805 Napoleon Bonaparte had himself crowned King of Italy at Milan, with suitable splendour and magnificence. Seated upon a throne, he was invested with the usual insignia of royalty by the Cardinal-Archbishop of Milan and, ascending the altar, he took the iron crown, placed it on his head, and exclaimed, being part of the ceremony used at the enthronement of the Lombard kings, "" ('God gives it to me, beware whoever touches it').

On the occasion, Napoleon founded the Order of the Iron Crown, on 15 June 1805. After Napoleon's fall and the annexation of Lombardy to Austria, the order was reinstituted by the Austrian Emperor Francis I, on 1 January 1816.

The last to be crowned with the Iron Crown was Emperor Ferdinand I, in his role as King of Lombardy and Venetia. This occurred in Milan, on 6 September 1838.

After the Second Italian War of Independence, when the Austrians had to withdraw from Lombardy in 1859, the Iron Crown was moved to Vienna, where it remained until 1866, when it was given back to Italy after the Third Italian War of Independence.

Coronation rite for the kings of Italy

From the 9th to the 18th century, the Kings of Italy were also the Holy Roman Emperors, so many of them were crowned at Pavia, the official capital of the Kingdom.

The earliest definitively documented use of the Iron Crown in a coronation was at that of Henry VII at Milan in 1311 or 1312, a ceremony with French and Roman influences that was the most elaborate example of the Milanese coronation rite. It was given to the King with the words "" ('Receive this royal crown') and the prayer "" ('God of continuity'). This followed the King's receiving the sword of state and preceded the scepter, verge, and orb and cross.

Scientific analysis
In 1993, the crown was subjected to extensive scientific analysis performed by the University of Milan using X-ray fluorescence (XRF) analysis and radiocarbon dating.  The XRF analysis on the crown metal revealed that all the foils, rosettes and bezels were made with the same alloy, made of 84–85% gold, 5–7% silver, and 8–10% copper, suggesting a contemporary construction of the main part of the crown, while the fillets external to the enamel plates and the hinge pins were made of 90–91% gold and 9–10% silver, suggesting subsequent reworking.

Three of the 24 vitreous enamel plates are visually different from the others in colour and construction, and were traditionally considered to be later restorations. The XRF analysis confirmed that they were made with a different technique, with their glass being made of potassium salt, while the others are made of sodium salt (sodium is not directly detectable by the XRF analysis).

Radiocarbon dating of fragments of beeswax used to fix the enamel plates to the gold foils of the crown showed that the wax under the "strange" plates was from around 500 AD, while the ones under the "normal" plates came from around 800 AD. This is consistent with the tradition of a more antique crown, further decorated during the reign of Theoderic (with the addition of the enamels), and then extensively restored during the reign of Charlemagne.

The "iron nail" was found to be 99% silver, meaning the crown contains no iron. A note from the Roman Ceremonial of 1159 provides that the Iron Crown is so called "", stating that the iron was once laid  the crown (probably as an arc, as in other crowns of the era), not into it. Speculations have been made that the silver circle was added by the goldsmith Antellotto Bracciforte, who restored the crown in 1345 to reinforce it given that the (presumed) theft of two plates had weakened the hinges. (Currently, in one of the crown's junctions, two of the plates are not joined by the hinge, which is too damaged, but are held only by the inner silver ring.) In 1352, for the first time, a document (the inventory of the treasury of the Cathedral of Monza) describes the crown as being .

The gems in the crown are seven red garnets, seven blue corundums (sapphires), four violet amethysts, and four gems made of glass.

Cultural references
A surprising image of the Iron Crown figures in Chapter 37 "Sunset" of Herman Melville's Moby-Dick. The brief chapter is devoted to Captain Ahab's soliloquy. Among his delusions of persecution and of grandeur, he imagines himself crowned with the Iron Crown of Lombardy.

The Italian film La corona di ferro (1941), directed by Alessandro Blasetti, tells a story about the arrival of the crown in Italy.

In the Father Brown TV series, the crown figures in episode 70 (The Two Deaths of Hercule Flambeau).

Notes

References

Further reading
 Buccellatin, Graziella, and Holly Snapp, eds. The Iron Crown and Imperial Europe. (Milan: Mondadori) 3 vols. and plates, 1995, with contributions by Annamaria Ambrosioni, Peter Burke, Carlo Paganini, Reinhard Elze, Roberto Cassanelli, Felipe Ruiz Martin, Alberto Tenenti, Alain Pillepich, Henrike Mraz and Giorgio Rumi.
 Valeriana Maspero, La corona ferrea. La storia del più antico e celebre simbolo del potere in Europa'', Vittone Editore, Monza, 2003. (Italian).

External links

  La Corona Ferrea
  Le gemme della Corona Ferrea
 Order of the Iron Crown
 Coat-of-Arms of Napoleonic Kingdom of Italy, 1805–1815, with the Iron Crown on an escutcheon

Individual crowns
Italian culture
Medieval crowns
Monarchy in Italy
Reliquaries of the True Cross
Henry VII, Holy Roman Emperor